Minute to Win It: Singapore Edition is a Singaporean primetime game show that originally ran on MediaCorp Channel 5 with host Bryan Wong. The show is part of an international franchise, Minute to Win It. Contestants take part in a series of 60-second challenges that use objects that are commonly available around the house. Contestants who managed to complete all 10 challenges will win S$250,000. The first episode airs on Saturday (August 9, 2014), 8:20pm, right after the live telecast of the nation's 49th National Day Parade. Subsequent episodes were telecast on every Wednesday beginning from 13 August 2014 at 8:00pm.

The show sponsors are: Pokka, Wrigley's Eclipse Mints, Hershey's, Burger King and ASA Holidays.

Gameplay

Rules

The contestant is presented with the blueprint for the first game (level) and must successfully complete a game within 60 seconds to win the first level (was $1,000 in all versions) and advance to the next level. After successfully completing the fourth and seventh level games, the contestant is guaranteed to leave with no less than the cash award for those levels. If the contestant can complete the final game, the contestant will earn $250,000.

The difficulty of the games progressively increase throughout the show. If time expires or the conditions of the game cannot be fulfilled (such as by the contestant exhausting any allotted attempts or committing a foul), the contestant loses a "life". If the contestant loses all three of their "lives", the game ends and the contestant's winnings drop to the previous milestone they passed.

After successfully completing a game, the contestant can leave with the amount of money already won before seeing the blueprint for the next game. However, once the contestant elects for the game, the contestant cannot leave the show until that game is complete or they have exhausted all three of their "lives".

In episodes featuring teams of two contestants, some games are played by both players, while others are played solo. A player can only make three consecutive attempts at solo games (including re-attempts following losing a life; an intervening team game does not reset this count). After a player makes three attempts, the other player is forced to attempt the next solo game.

Prizes

Successfully completing a challenge is worth a specific cash prize at each level. Contestants who successfully complete challenge on levels with bolded amounts in the table below are guaranteed to leave with no less than the cash award at that level should they fail any later challenge.

Level 3, 5 and 7 are the safety levels for the celebrities who are playing for their charities.

Episode Summary/Statistics

 These players played for charity.
 Host Bryan Wong played this game, just for charity reasons.
 If Raizal chose to play the next game, it would be Cyclone. This was revealed by the host Bryan Wong.

Bold denotes the winning pair who managed to win some money
Bold +  denotes the winners with the top prize (cleared the top prize level)

All statistics are accurate as of Season 1.
 Most money won: $100,000 (Episode 11)
 Total winnings to date: $228,000 (As at the end of Season 1)
 Total number of winners (by persons) who won some money: 30 (As at the end of Season 1)
 Total number of winners who complete all 10 challenges: 0
 Total number of contestants who got nothing (did not clear the first safety level): 10
 Total number of contestants (by persons) who appeared on the show: 40
 Number of different games played so far: 60
 The highest level attempted up to date: Level 9
 Games that no one have ever survived: Johnny Applestack, Frankenstein, Egg Roll, CD Dominoes, Walrus, Egg Tower, Cyclone

References

External links
 Official website

Minute to Win It
2014 Singaporean television series debuts
2014 Singaporean television series endings
Non-American television series based on American television series
Channel 5 (Singapore) original programming